The Deputy Chair of the Mazhilis is a post in the Mazhilis (part of the parliament of Kazakhstan) that is selected by the MP's and are proposed by the Chair of the Mazhilis. The office was established on 30 January 1996 and since 2007, the position of deputy chairs have been occupied by two people at the same time. The Deputy Chair is in charge of carrying out tasks made by the Mazhilis Chair and take over certain roles if the chair isn't able to do.

List of Deputy Chairs

1st Convocation (1996–1999)

2nd Convocation (1999–2004)

3rd Convocation (2004–2007)

4th Convocation (2007–2012)

5th Convocation (2012–2016)

6th Convocation (2016–2021)

See also 

 Chair of the Mazhilis
 Mazhilis

References 

Government of Kazakhstan